Johannes Vallentin Dominicus Werbata (Padang, 22 September 1866 - Magelang, 2 June 1929), better known by his initials JVD, was a military superintendent, first class sensor and knight in the Military William Order fourth grade.

Sources
1900. J. van R. J.D.V. Werbata. Ridder vierde klasse in de Militaire Willemsorde. Militair opzichter, eerste klasse opnemer. Eigen Haard, blz. 447-448
2006. P. van der Krogt. The Werbata-Jonckheer maps. The first topographic maps of the Netherlands Antilles, 1911-1915. International Symposium on “Old Worlds-New Worlds”: The History of Colonial Cartography 1750–1950. Utrecht University, Utrecht, The Netherlands, 21 to 23 August 2006.

1866 births
1929 deaths
Royal Netherlands East Indies Army officers
Aceh War
Dutch cartographers
Knights Fourth Class of the Military Order of William
People from Padang